José Fabio Micha Mikue (born 20 June 1994) is an Equatorial Guinean footballer who plays as a forward for Futuro Kings FC and the Equatorial Guinea national team. He is also known as Doraso, a tribute to former French international footballer Vikash Dhorasoo.

Club career
Micha played for Akonangui FC at the 2014 CAF Champions League, Sony de Elá Nguema at the 2015 CAF Champions League, AD Racing de Micomeseng at the 2017 CAF Confederation Cup and Deportivo Niefang at the 2018 CAF Confederation Cup. He moved to Futuro Kings FC in 2019.

International career
Micha made his international debut for Equatorial Guinea on 28 July 2019.

References

1994 births
Living people
Association football forwards
Association football midfielders
Equatoguinean footballers
Equatorial Guinea international footballers
Akonangui FC players
CD Elá Nguema players
AD Racing de Micomeseng players
Deportivo Niefang players
Futuro Kings FC players